Csányi is a Hungarian noble surname of Csányi family. Notable people with this surname include:

Ákos Csányi
Balázs Csányi
Bernát Csányi (disambiguation) (several people)
Bernát Csányi (politician)
Bernát Csányi (soldier)
György Csányi
György Csányi (politician)
Karol Csányi
Márton Csányi
Sándor Csányi (disambiguation) (several people)
Sándor Csányi (actor)
Sándor Csányi (banker)
Valéria Csányi
Zoltán Csányi

See also
 

Hungarian-language surnames